Mali Lošinj is a town in the Primorje-Gorski Kotar County, on the island of Lošinj, in western Croatia. At the time of the 2011 census, there were 8,116 inhabitants, of whom 86% were Croats.

The favourable climatic conditions, the construction of hotels and resorts, foresting and maintenance of beaches have led to an intensive development of tourism. The town is located in the most protected part of the Lošinj bay, on the eastern, sunny side of the island.

The asteroid 10415 Mali Lošinj is named after this town.

History

The town was first mentioned in 1398, under the name Malo selo ("small village"). In 1868, it experienced its golden year. There were as many as eleven shipyards, and it became the place with the largest and most developed merchant marine in the Adriatic Sea, even ahead of cities like Rijeka, Trieste and Venice. American author Kenneth Roberts observed that the little town, like some in southern Maine, seemed to have "produced a hundred seamen for each one produced elsewhere." Writing in 1938, Roberts said there were currently "four hundred sea captains living on Lussinpiccolo, which is about the size of Monhegan Island- captains of all sorts of vessels, from thirty thousand ton liners to hundred ton merchant brigs."

With the invention of the steam engine a stagnation in development ensues, and with the outbreak of the grapevine-disease peronospora. 
Previously part of the Venetian Republic, Mali Lošinj passed under Austrian-Hungarian rule in 1797 with the Treaty of Campo Formio. The isle remained under Austrian-Hungarian rule until 1918. After World War I, under the provisions of the Treaty of Rapallo it was given to the Kingdom of Italy.  In 1947, it was incorporated into Yugoslavia. Its incorporation into socialist Yugoslavia led to mass emigration of the Italian population. After World War II there were only 2,200 residents left. In 1991, it became part of present-day Croatia.

Population

Climate

Mayors

Gallery

See also
Matteo Martinolich

References

Further reading

External links

 Losinj Island tourist guide

Cities and towns in Croatia
Populated coastal places in Croatia
Populated places in Primorje-Gorski Kotar County
Lošinj